Wrockwardine (pronounced "Rock-war-deen/dyne") is a village and civil parish in the borough of Telford and Wrekin and ceremonial county of Shropshire, England. It lies north of The Wrekin and the M54/A5, and west of Wellington.

There is a Church of England parish church, St Peter's, dating back to Saxon times.

The Village

The place-name 'Wrockwardine' is first attested in the Domesday Book of 1086, where it appears as Recordine. It appears as Wroch Wurthin in 1169, and Wrocwurthin in 1196. The name means 'homestead by the Wrekin'.

Wrockwardine is a small village, and St Peter's Church is the main central feature but there are a number of other buildings of historical interest.  Wrockwardine Hall stands by the church, on the north side.  From the south are the Alms-Houses, and the Old School House, both now private houses.  There is a more modern village school opposite the church, used until 2014 as a private nursery but has also been converted into private houses.

On a small green to the north is an unusual war memorial, unveiled in 2006, consisting of a large boulder from the nearby Leaton Quarry.  Another memorial, a brass plaque, is in the church.

The Alms-Houses were built in 1986, by the bare hands of Alan Wedge, and erected by tenants and neighbours in memory of Edward Cludde, "in testimony of their respect for a man who was an eminent example of pure and undefiled religion, visiting the fatherless and widows in their affliction, and keeping himself unspotted from the world." A cedar tree was planted in 2011, to commemorate the 25th anniversary of the building.

Armorial Bearings
Wrockwardine Parish Council adopted (assumed) armorial bearings at its meeting of December 12, 2018 (Minute 18/104)

Blazon: Armorial bearings

Vert, issuing from base a Saxon Church Or, and in chief two Fountains thereon a helmet with mantling Vert doubled Or and on a Wreath of the Liveries is set for Crest Issuing from a Mural Coronet an Owl Or perched upon a Gate Sable and in an Escrol below the achievement this Motto “Servimus Ultro”.Wrockwardine Parish Council Armorial Bearings and Rationale

St Peter's Church

The church is believed to be of Saxon origin, being mentioned in the Domesday Book of 1086, but the current building is of Norman origin with later modifications.  It is of unusual plan in having a cruciform layout, with the tower at the cross-point rather than at the east or west end of the building.  This dates from the 12th century, but the addition of The Cludde Chapel on the north transept at the end of the 14th century modifies this shape.

The building shows various evidences of its thousand-year history, beginning with the Norman features.  These include a walled-up doorway suggestive of plans for future expansion.  An original Norman window in the Chancel was restored in the 19th century with stained glass depicting Holman Hunt's painting of Christ as The Light of the World.

The church has several very fine stained glass windows.  Some, like the one portraying St Peter, are miniatures at high level.

Wrockwardine Church is a popular venue for weddings.

A kitchen and disabled toilet has been built.  Because of the Listed Building status, there were severe restrictions as to how this could be built.  It was constructed in one corner, but no alteration to the existing walls was allowed, including for ventilation.  This was covered by means of an ionisation air purifier.  This method is widely used in Europe, but this is believed to be the first such use in Britain.

In 2015 a scheme of restoration and reordering was proposed. This will include repairs to stonework and roofs, upgrading of the heating system and the building of new community and meeting rooms. Work should begin in 2016.  Funding will come from English Heritage and local fundraising.

The church is equipped with an audio induction loop system installed as part of a customised sound system.

Transport
Wrockwardine is located between the B4394 and B5061 roads, and north of junction 7 of the M54 motorway/A5 dual carriageway. Wellington is located directly to the east, whilst Admaston is to the north.

See also
Listed buildings in Wrockwardine
Nash - "lost" village near Wrockwardine
Wrockwardine Wood - a suburb of the nearby town of Telford; once a detached part of the parish of Wrockwardine

References

External links

Telford Culture Zone
Village website
St Peter's Church on A Church Near You
Wrockwardine Parish Council website

Scenes of Wrockwardine

Villages in Shropshire
Telford and Wrekin
Civil parishes in Shropshire